Donita Kathleen Paul (born November 20, 1950) is a best-selling contemporary Christian fiction novelist. Best known for her fantasy DragonKeeper Chronicles series, she won a finalist medal in the Christy Awards for the first installment of the DragonKeeper Chronicles, DragonSpell. She has also written romances and juvenile novels under the name Kathleen Paul. Born in Lawrence, Kansas, Paul now lives in eastern Colorado.

Biography
Paul studied elementary education in college as preparation for being a mother; she soon became a single mother and worked as an elementary-school teacher. It wasn't until flesh-eating bacteria in her leg put her in the hospital for 21 days that she seriously turned to writing at her mother's urging. She submitted a romance novel she had written for her thirteen-year-old daughter, and it was published.

Writing career
Paul began writing as a teen. She and three or four friends would write during the week and share their stories at a Friday night slumber party. She took the Institute of Children's Literature correspondence course when her children were preschoolers, and she later wrote a romance novel for her thirteen-year-old daughter, but she didn't settle down to writing until she got an infection in her leg that ultimately ended her school-teaching career.

After her initial success writing romances, Paul tried fantasy when her mother challenged her to write "something different, bigger, deeper". The eventual result was the DragonKeeper Chronicles.

Bibliography

DragonKeeper Chronicles Series

Chiril Chronicles Series

Realm Walkers

Romance Novels
 Escape (1999)
 To See His Way (2000)
 The Heart of a Child (2000)
 Out in the Real World (2001)
 City Dreams (2001)
 Christmas Letters (2001)
 Woven Hearts (2002)
 Kaleidoscope (2005)

References

External links
 Official site

1950 births
Living people
20th-century American novelists
21st-century American novelists
Christian novelists
American Christian writers
American women novelists
20th-century American women writers
21st-century American women writers